Jamal Abdel Nasser Street (also spelled Gamal Abdel Nasser Street and alternatively known as Thalatheny Street) is a major street in Gaza City, State of Palestine, that originates in the Old City where it branches off Ni'im al-Din al-Arabi Street and runs north into Rimal where it connects to Ahmed Orabi Street, the main coastal highway. It runs parallel to Omar Mukhtar Street.

The street was named after the late President of Egypt and pan-Arabist leader Gamal Abdel Nasser. The unofficial, but common local name is Thalatheny Street, which is named after the Thalatheny clan who have historically lived in that area.

Major buildings located along Jamal Abdel Nasser Street include the Gaza headquarters of the United Nations Relief and Works Agency (UNRWA), the al-Azhar University and the Islamic University of Gaza.

References

Streets in Gaza City